Artur Kejza (born 8 March 1974) is a Polish practitioner of judo.

Achievements

See also
European Judo Championships
History of martial arts
Judo in Poland
List of judo techniques
List of judoka
Martial arts timeline

References

1974 births
Living people
Polish male judoka
Place of birth missing (living people)